Laubuka brahmaputraensis, is a cyprinid fish in the family Cyprinidae. It is endemic to the Brahmaputra River in Bangladesh.

References

Laubuka
fish of Bangladesh 
Cyprinid fish of Asia
Fish described in 2012